Telonemia is a phylum of microscopic eukaryote, single-celled organisms. They were formerly classified as protists until that kingdom fell out of general use, and are suggested to have evolutionary significance in being a possible transitional form between ecologically important heterotrophic and photosynthetic species among chromalveolates.

One paper places them in the SAR supergroup. Phylogenomic analyses of 127 genes place Telonemia with Centroheliozoa in a group also consisting of cryptomonads and haptophytes (see Cryptomonads-haptophytes assemblage).

Although they have been studied in primarily marine environments, they have also been found in freshwater.

Shalchian-Tabrizi et al say that 18S rDNA sequences in the phylum formed two major groups, Group 1 and 2, including T. subtilis and T. antarcticum respectively, and that these were further sub-divided into several statistically supported clades of sequences with restricted geographic distribution. Species of Telonemia are heterotrophic predators, feeding on a wide range of bacteria and pico- to nano-sized phytoplankton. Chloroplasts have not been observed in any of the investigated species. By using specific PCR primers, they revealed a much larger diversity of Telonemia from environmental samples than previously uncovered by eukaryote-wide primers. They are globally distributed in marine waters and are frequently encountered in environmental clone libraries. The evolutionary origin of Telonemia was inferred from phylogenetic reconstruction of single- and concatenated sequences obtained from both cultured strains and environmental clones.

Pawlowski identifies it as a micro-kingdom. It is considered sister of the SAR group.

Species
Although only two species have been described formally, DNA sequences collected from seawater suggest there are many more species which have not yet been described.

 Class Telonemea Cavalier-Smith 1993 [Telonemia Shalchian-Tabrizi 2006]
 Order Telonemida Cavalier-Smith 1993
 Family Telonemidae Cavalier-Smith 1993
 Genera Lateronema Cavalier-Smith 2015
 Species Lateronema antarctica (Thomsen 2005) Cavalier-Smith 2015 [Telonema antarctica Thomsen 1992]
 Genera Telonema Griessmann 1913
 Species Telonema subtile Griessmann 1913 [Telonema subtilis Griessmann, 1913]

History

The genus Telonema was described in 1913 by Griessmann.

References

External links
 Taxonomy, from the Taxonomy Browser of the National Center for Biotechnology Information.
 Images, etc. from iSpecies.org

Hacrobia
Enigmatic eukaryote taxa
Bikont phyla